Fairmount is an unincorporated community in Sussex County, Delaware, United States. It is one of the Three Sisters communities consisting of Fairmount, Hollyville, and Hollymount. Fairmount is the area located around the intersections of Delaware Route 5 and Delaware Route 23.

The community is part of the Salisbury, Maryland-Delaware Metropolitan Statistical Area.

History
Fairmount's population was 20 in 1925, and 100 in 1960.

References

Unincorporated communities in Sussex County, Delaware
Unincorporated communities in Delaware